Emiliano Mascetti (11 March 1943 – 6 April 2022) was an Italian footballer, who played as a midfielder, and football executive.

Playing career
Born in Como, Mascetti played for Como, Pisa, Verona and Torino. He spent 11 seasons with Verona and held the club's record for goals scored in Serie A with 35 until he was surpassed by Luca Toni in 2015. He scored a total of 46 goals for the club in 330 appearances.

After retirement
After retiring as a player, Mascetti worked for Verona as a sporting director, and also held roles at Roma and Atalanta.

References

External links
 

1943 births
2022 deaths
Sportspeople from Como
Italian footballers
Association football midfielders
Como 1907 players
Pisa S.C. players
Hellas Verona F.C. players
Torino F.C. players
Serie B players
Serie A players
Association football executives
Hellas Verona F.C. non-playing staff
A.S. Roma non-playing staff
Atalanta B.C. non-playing staff
Footballers from Lombardy